Breitenau concentration camp was one of the first concentration camps established by the Nazis. It was founded in June 1933 as an addition to the Breitenau Labor and Welfare House, less than six months after the Nazis by a democratic election in Germany became the majority party in the German parliament. It closed in March 1934 and reopened in 1940 where it remained in operation until the end of World War II. In 1984, a memorial was constructed on the site of the former camp.

History
In 1133, Benedictines founded a monastery at Breitenau. Philip I, Landgrave of Hesse converted the monastery to an estate in 1527. By 1579, it became a horse stable and warehouse for agricultural products. Between the early 17th and late 19th centuries, it mostly served as a country residence.

It was converted into a prison labor camp for beggars, vagabonds, and so-called "lewd women" in 1874. Three years later, an institution for the rural poor was established alongside the prison camp. Treatment at the prison was considered cruel with lengthy sentences and hard labor for minor criminal offenses, including poverty.

The Nazis converted the camp into a concentration camp for political prisoners in June 1933. It closed approximately nine months later in March 1934. During this time, the camp held political prisoners from Hesse and Thuringia, Germany.

In 1940, the camp reopened and served as a forced labor camp until 1945. This period marked a shift in which both Germans and foreigners were detained together. It is estimated that approximately 6,500 foreigners and 2,000–2,500 Germans were enslaved here.

Breitenau Memorial
In 1984, a memorial was established in memory of those who were detained, enslaved, and murdered at the Breitenau concentration camp. It was built in a tithe barn that has been dated to the 15th century when it belonged to the original monastery. Compensation became available to survivors of the Breitenau concentration camp in 2000 with the memorial helping them apply for compensation.

Other early concentration camps 
 Breslau-Dürrgoy concentration camp in Wrocław, Poland
 Esterwegen concentration camp
 Kemna concentration camp
 Oranienburg concentration camp
 Sonnenburg concentration camp
 Vulkanwerft concentration camp in the Bredow district of Stettin

See also
 
 The Holocaust
 List of concentration and internment camps
 List of Nazi concentration camps
 Nazi concentration camps
 Nazi Party
 World War II
 
 The United States Holocaust Memorial Museum Encyclopedia of Camps and Ghettos, 1933–1945, vol. 1

References

External links
United States Holocaust Memorial Museum Website

Nazi concentration camps in Germany
Reich Security Main Office